Solva Sawan is a 1979 Indian Hindi-language romantic drama film directed by Bharathiraja. The film stars Sridevi and Amol Palekar, with Dina Pathak and Kulbhushan Kharbanda in supporting roles. It is a remake of Bharathiraja's own Tamil film 16 Vayathinile (1977), which also starred Sridevi. The film marked Sridevi's debut as a leading actress in Hindi cinema following an already successful and established career in South Indian cinema. She was 16 years old during the film making. Unlike the original, the film was a critical and commercial failure.

Plot 
Mehna is a 16-year-old girl filled with ambitions of becoming a teacher. She is an intelligent woman living in a small community and experiences great love when sees the new vet who has come to visit. Many are impressed by this charming young fellow who has entered the village. He seems to be a wealthy, prosperous man and soon develops a relationship with Mehna. Mehna, who is deep in love, sacrifices her opportunity to study in the teaching college course to spend time with him. Little does she know, that he has not yet revealed his true colours when he leaves her and retires from the village when she refuses to commit to him.

Sri Devi's distant cousin played by Amol Palekar is intellectually disabled, and because he is lame, he is taken advantage of and isolated by the society. He is secretly in love with Mehna, and when he sees her in love with the vet, he is jealous and upset. After being shunned by the vet, Mehna has a new perspective on life and begins to accept Palekar's character, encouraging him to defend himself against those who constantly mock him. But when a rowdy villager, played by Kulbhushan Kharbanda, attempts to rape Mehna, Palekar's character kills him by throwing a brick at his head. Palekar's character is arrested for murder, and the film concludes with Mehna waiting at a train station for his return.

Cast 
Sridevi as Mehna
Amol Palekar
Kulbhushan Kharbanda
Madhukar
Dina Pathak

Soundtrack 
The music was composed by Jaidev, and lyrics were written by Naqsh Lyallpuri.

References

External links 
 

1970s Hindi-language films
1979 films
1979 romantic drama films
Films directed by Bharathiraja
Hindi remakes of Tamil films
Indian romantic drama films